Mr. & Mrs. Smith is a 2005 American action comedy film directed by Doug Liman and written by Simon Kinberg. The film stars Brad Pitt and Angelina Jolie as a bored upper middle class married couple surprised to learn that they are assassins belonging to competing agencies, and that they have been assigned to kill each other. Besides being a box office hit,  Mr. & Mrs. Smith also established Pitt and Jolie's personal relationship.

The film was released in the United States on June 10, 2005. It received mixed reviews from critics and grossed $487 million worldwide.

Plot
John, a construction executive and Jane, a tech support consultant are answering questions during marriage counselling. The couple has been married for five or six years, but their marriage is on the rocks. They talk about how they first met in Bogotá, Colombia claiming to be together to avoid being questioned by Colombian authorities; the two fell in love and got married.

In reality John and Jane are both skilled field operatives and work for separate contract killing firms; they are both among the best in their field and adept at concealing their true profession from the other. 

The Smiths live in a large Colonial Revival house in the suburbs keeping up appearances by reluctantly socializing with their "conventionally" wealthy neighbors. Underneath their cover stories, John and Jane balance their marriage which is apparently mundane —after a few years both agree it is becoming dull and suffocating—with their secretive career. After they are both assigned to kill DIA prisoner Benjamin "the Tank" Danz in a prison transfer, they run into each other on the job and the hit is botched.

Danz survives; John and Jane are assigned to kill each other instead. After attempts on each other's lives escalate, the Smiths' conflict ends in a massive shootout which nearly demolishes their home. During a protracted, evenly matched fight, they pull guns aiming at each other's head. John declines to shoot saying that he loves Jane and lays his gun down. Jane discovers that she cannot shoot John either and they spend a passionate night together. The renewed Smith partnership is quickly threatened by their employers who join forces to eliminate the couple. 

Eddie, John's best friend and co-worker turns down a bounty of $400,000 for each of them. The Smiths find themselves under attack from an army of assassins. Their pockmarked house is blown up, the Smiths steal their neighbor's minivan, and are able to destroy their attackers' three pursuing armored sedans while they bicker about their fighting styles and personal secrets they have discovered about each other. They meet with Eddie and decide to save their marriage. 

The Smiths kidnap Danz from his high-security prison to use as a bargaining chip. He tells them that he is merely bait and an intern hired by each of their employers after they discovered the Smiths were married; his clients hoped the Smiths would kill each other. Discarding each of their contingency plans the two make a last stand together, fending off an assault inside a home decorating store by heavily armed operatives. The film ends with the couple meeting their marriage counselor again; the Smiths say their marriage is thriving.

Cast

 Brad Pitt as John Smith
 Angelina Jolie as Jane Smith
 Vince Vaughn as Eddie
 Adam Brody as Benjamin "the Tank" Danz
 Kerry Washington as Jasmine
 Keith David as Father
 Chris Weitz as Martin Coleman
 Rachael Huntley as Suzy Coleman
 Michelle Monaghan as Gwen
 Stephanie March as Julie
 Jennifer Morrison as Jade
 Perrey Reeves as Jessie
 William Fichtner as Dr. Wexler, the marriage counselor (uncredited)
 Angela Bassett as the voice of Mr. Smith's boss, Atlanta (uncredited)

Casting
Nicole Kidman was originally cast as Jane Smith, however Brad Pitt dropped out from the film and Kidman left as a result. Doug Liman then considered Will Smith and Catherine Zeta-Jones as the leads; Johnny Depp and Cate Blanchett were also set to be cast. Pitt returned when Gwyneth Paltrow was cast as Jane. Paltrow later quit leading to Angelina Jolie coming on board. Gwen Stefani also auditioned for Jane Smith.

Background
Screenwriter Simon Kinberg had an idea for a screenplay after listening to a couple of his friends who went to marriage therapy. He thought it sounded "aggressive and mercenary" and felt "it would make an interesting template for a relationship inside of an action film."

The production eventually exceeded its budget by $26 million, forcing Liman to use money from his own savings account to build a set in his mother's garage. He then destroyed it with a hand grenade.

Music 
Three soundtrack albums were released from the film: a film score composed by John Powell, a U.S. soundtrack with songs used in the film and an International Soundtrack with the song by Pink Martini replaced with KansasCali. The albums were released at different times to avoid confusion; the former was released on June 28, 2005, and the latter on June 7, 2005.

Score track listing
 "Bogota"
 "The Bedroom"
 "Playing House"
 "Assignments"
 "His and Her Hits"
 "Office Work"
 "Desert Foxes"
 "John and Jane's Identity"
 "Dinner"
 "Hood Jump"
 "Mutual Thoughts"
 "John Drops In"
 "Tango de Los Asesinos"
 "Two Phone Calls"
 "Kiss and Make Up"
 "Minivan Chase"
 "Shopping Spree"
 "Dodging Bullets"
 "The Next Adventure"
 "Jesus of Surburbia"

Soundtrack track listing
 "Love Stinks" – The J. Geils Band
 "Nothin' but a Good Time" – Poison
 "Tainted Love" – Soft Cell
 "Baby, Baby" – Amy Grant
 "Express Yourself" (Mocean Worker Remix) – Charles Wright & the Watts 103rd Street Rhythm Band
 "Mondo Bongo" – Joe Strummer & The Mescaleros
 "Lay Lady Lay" – Magnet featuring Gemma Hayes
 "I Melt with You" – Nouvelle Vague
 "Nobody Does It Better" – 8mm
 "Let's Never Stop Falling in Love" – Pink Martini
 "Tango De Los Asesinos (Assassin's Tango)" – John Powell
 "Used to Love Her (But I Had To Kill Her)" – Voodoo Glow Skulls
 "You Are My Sunshine" – Stine J.
 "You've Lost That Lovin' Feelin'" – The Righteous Brothers
 "Making Love Out of Nothing at All" – Air Supply
 "You Give Love a Bad Name" – Atreyu
 "Love Will Keep Us Together" – Captain & Tennille

Release

Box office
Mr. & Mrs. Smith opened on June 10, 2005 in the United States and Canada in 3,424 theaters. The film ranked at the top in its opening weekend, accumulating $50,342,878. Mr. & Mrs. Smith went on to gross $186,336,279 in North America and had a worldwide total of $478,207,520. It was the highest-grossing film for both superstars Brad Pitt and Angelina Jolie, but was later surpassed by World War Z for Pitt and Maleficent for Jolie.

Critical response

Review aggregation website Rotten Tomatoes gave Mr. & Mrs. Smith an approval rating of 60% based on 215 reviews, with an average score of 6.10/10. The site's critics consensus reads, "Although this action-romance suffers from weak writing and one too many explosions, the chemistry generated by onscreen couple Pitt and Jolie is palpable enough to make this a thoroughly enjoyable summer action flick." At Metacritic, which assigns a normalized rating out to reviews from mainstream critics, the film has received a rating average of 55 out of 100, based on 41 critics, which indicated "mixed or average reviews". Audiences surveyed by CinemaScore gave the film an average grade of "B+" on an A+ to F scale.

Simon Braund of Empire gave the film a positive review, describing it as "a full-on action flick, subversive rom-com and weapons-grade star vehicle that's drenched in Tinseltown glitz, from a director who knows how to put the money on the screen while his tongue's firmly in his cheek". Daniel Saney of Digital Spy gave the film four stars out of five, saying "Its ideas are often borrowed, and it's hardly deep and meaningful, but it's a fantastically fun film". Roger Ebert of the Chicago Sun-Times gave the film 3 stars out of 4, he praised the chemistry between the lead actors, saying "What makes the movie work is that Pitt and Jolie have fun together on the screen and they're able to find a rhythm that allows them to be understated and amused even during the most alarming developments". In a negative review, Mick LaSalle of the San Francisco Chronicle described the film as "awful" and stated that "The tiny smidgen of cleverness on display here is contained entirely in the premise. The follow-through is nonexistent".

Plagiarism accusations
In 2006, New Zealand author Gavin Bishop accused the makers of the movie of plagiarizing his 1997 school book The Secret Lives of Mr and Mrs Smith, starring a husband and wife living apparently dull suburban lives but unbeknown to the other both work as spies, and said he intended to sue if a law firm willing to share proceeds if successful would approach him.

Home media

A single-disc DVD of the film was released on November 29, 2005, and a two-disc unrated version of the film was released on DVD on June 6, 2006. During director Doug Liman's audio commentary which is on the single-disc DVD release, he says that the film was edited for sexual and violent content to get a PG-13 rating. Mr. & Mrs. Smith was released on Blu-ray on December 4, 2007. It includes extra material from the 2005 single-disc DVD release but does not include additional material from the 2006 two-disc unrated version.

Inaccurate depiction of Bogotá

The government of Colombia criticized the film in particular for showing the capital Bogotá as a small village in the middle of the jungle with a hot and humid climate. President Alvaro Uribe Vélez and Mayor Luis Eduardo Garzón invited Angelina Jolie, Brad Pitt, and the producers to get to know the city and realize the mistakes they made.

Adaptations and  TV series reboot

In 2007, a pilot for a spin-off television series was made for the network ABC. Set six months after the end of the film, it was written by Simon Kinberg and directed by Doug Liman. Kinberg described the proposed television series as "Married... with Children with guns." The roles of John and Jane were played by Martin Henderson and Jordana Brewster. On website The Futon Critic, Brian Ford Sullivan criticised the chemistry between Henderson and Brewster and ended his review stating, "While there's always a few gems that get locked away in the networks' vaults each year, this decidedly isn't one of them". ABC decided not to commission the series.

The film is parodied in Treehouse of Horror XVIII, a 2007 episode of the animated television series The Simpsons.

In June 2010, Jolie said that she and Pitt had inquired about a sequel to the film but were dissatisfied with the story. Jolie remarked, "We did ask somebody to look into Mr. & Mrs. to see if they could crack a sequel, but there wasn't anything original. It was just, 'Well, they're going to get married, or they've got kids, or they get separated.' Never great."

In July 2011, it was announced that Hong Kong studio New Asia Entertainment Group would produce a remake entitled Assassin Couple. Donnie Yen and Cecilia Cheung were to star in the lead roles and the studio stated that, while the film would have some similarities with Mr. & Mrs. Smith, it would feature a new storyline. The budget for the film was set at $18.7 million.

In February 2021, Amazon Studios announced that a television series reboot based on the original film, starring Donald Glover and Phoebe Waller-Bridge, was set to be released on Amazon Prime Video in 2022. However due to creative differences with Glover, Waller-Bridge exited the project in early September 2021 and her part was set to be recast. In April 2022, it was reported that Maya Erskine took over the role from Waller-Bridge.

See also 
 Keeping Up with the Joneses (film)
Spy × Family

References

External links

 
 
 
 
 
 
 
 Mr. & Mrs. Smith at The Numbers

2000s crime comedy films
2000s romantic action films
2000s screwball comedy films
2005 action comedy films
2005 films
2005 romantic comedy films
20th Century Fox films
American action comedy films
American crime comedy films
American romantic comedy films
American screwball comedy films
Fictional married couples
Films about contract killing
Films about couples
Films directed by Doug Liman
Films produced by Akiva Goldsman
Films produced by Lucas Foster
Films scored by John Powell
Films set in Colombia
Films set in Virginia
Films shot in Los Angeles
Films shot in New York City
Films shot in Rome
Films with screenplays by Simon Kinberg
Romantic crime films
Regency Enterprises films
Summit Entertainment films
Films produced by Arnon Milchan
2000s English-language films
20th Century Studios franchises
2000s American films